Yapeyú is a town in the province of Corrientes, Argentina, in the San Martín Department. One of its notable monuments is the Arco Trunco.

Etymology
The word Yapeyú comes from the Guaraní language and means "ripe fruit"; in other times, it was also the name of the river that is called today Guaviraví. Presbyter Eduardo J. Maldonado considers it a combination of the guaraní words "Yaye" ("The place where") and "Peyú" ("blowing of the wind"). Under this perspective, "Yapeyú" would mean in guaraní language "The place where the wind blows".

History
The town was founded on December 4, 1626 by the Jesuit Pedro Romero, who gave it the name Villa de Nuestra Señora de los Santos Reyes Magos y Yapeyú. The town was one of the 30 missions established at the beginning of the 17th century that were destroyed in 1817 by the Portuguese army. The city was later rebuilt, and the ruins of the little fortress, which at the end of the 18th century had been the home of Lt. Juan de San Martín and his wife, Gregoria Matorras, were preserved.

Bibliography

References

External links

 
 Basic info about the town

Populated places in Corrientes Province